Zoltán Makláry (16 April 1896, Budapest – 12 July 1978, Budapest) was a Hungarian stage and film actor. He was awarded the Kossuth Prize.

Selected filmography
 Stars of Eger (1923)
 Hyppolit, the Butler (1931)
 Spring Shower (1932)
 Flying Gold (1932)
 Emmy (1934)
 Romance of Ida (1934)
 St. Peter's Umbrella (1935)
 Number 111 (1938)
 Young Noszty and Mary Toth (1938)
 The Perfect Man (1939)
 Cserebere (1940)
 Gül Baba (1940)
 Seven Plum Trees (1940)
 Háry János (1941)
 People of the Mountains (1942)
 Changing the Guard (1942)
 A Tanítónő (1945)
 The Sea Has Risen (1953)
 Professor Hannibal (1956)
 Édes Anna (1958)
 Yesterday (1959)
 The Golden Head (1964)
 Three Nights of Love (1967)

External links

1896 births
1978 deaths
Hungarian male film actors
Hungarian male silent film actors
20th-century Hungarian male actors
Hungarian male stage actors
Male actors from Budapest